Carlos Berlocq and Eduardo Schwank were the defending champions, but decided not to participate.
Jürgen Melzer and Philipp Petzschner defeated Marcel Granollers and Marc López in the final, 6–3, 6–4.

Seeds

Draw

Draw

References

External links
 Main draw

Stuttgart Open - Doubles
Doubles 2011